Skipton railway station is a Grade II listed station which serves the town of Skipton in North Yorkshire, England on the Airedale Line, which gives Skipton access to destinations such as Leeds, Bradford, Carlisle, Lancaster and Morecambe.

The station has four platforms. It is staffed on a part-time basis and a ticket office is available at most times (along with automatic ticket machines).  Ticket barriers are in operation and a Penalty fare scheme was implemented on the Airedale Line routes in December 2017.  Step-free access is available to all platforms from the station entrance (platforms 3 and 4 via subway). Skipton comes under the Dales Railcard. There are three seated waiting rooms available, luggage trolleys, a small café, toilets, a post box and a pay-phone. There is a taxi rank immediately outside the station, bus links nearby and the car park has spaces for 100 vehicles. The station is located on Broughton Road.

History
As the "Gateway to the Yorkshire Dales", Skipton historically has had high volumes of leisure traffic. Ilkley railway station serves as an alternative for this function being at the southern end of the Dales Way.

The original station was opened on 7 September 1847 by the Leeds and Bradford Extension Railway, as a temporary terminus of its line from Bradford. The line was extended to  a year later on 2 October 1848.

Initially, passengers would leave the train at Skipton for onward travel to the villages of Wharfedale by horse-drawn coach. There are still over 20 hotels clustered around the station, including the historic Herriots Hotel (formerly the Midland Hotel).

On 30 April 1876, Skipton station was relocated a quarter of a mile northwest of its original location. By now, both the Leeds and Bradford and North Western railways had been absorbed by the Midland Railway. The new station had four platforms and cost over £15,000, compared with the original station's cost of £2,300. Platform 1 was a bay platform at the Bradford end, adjacent to the station building along with through platform 2, while platforms 3 and 4 formed an island platform.

On 1 October 1888 platforms 5 and 6 were added to serve the Skipton to Ilkley Line, which opened that day. These platforms were at a slightly higher level on a rising gradient, as the new line ran southwest of the existing line and then crossed over it by bridge eastwards. Passenger services to Ilkley ceased on 22 March 1965, after which platforms 5 and 6 were closed to passengers and their access subway was bricked off. However, the line through platform 5 is still in use as a single-track freight line to Swinden Quarry via the former Yorkshire Dales line. The track through platform 6 has been lifted. The 1847 station buildings survived intact (latterly used as offices) until 1967, when they were demolished. The site is now occupied by a supermarket.

The line to  closed on 2 February 1970 and its tracks were lifted the following year.  The disused formation is still visible, though the A629 bypass road occupies a short section immediately west of the former junction with the line to Carlisle & Lancaster. An organisation called SELRAP is campaigning for the re-instatement of the link and runs occasional charter trains between the two stations, using a long diversionary route to point out the eleven mile "missing link".

In the 1970s, the track was removed from platform 1, and platform 4 was used as a siding. However, all four platforms were put back in use when the track layout and signalling were updated in 1994 for electrification.  As part of this work, both remaining signal boxes were closed and demolished (control initially passing to Leeds PSB and eventually to the IECC at ) and the former goods yard was converted for use as a carriage depot (complete with a new washer plant).  This was upgraded and expanded in 2011 to add capacity for a further three units. Several EMU and DMU sets are stored there overnight and at weekends.

In 1998, the station underwent complete renovation, in preparation for the introduction of direct InterCity services to London. In 2004 the station underwent another minor renovation in preparation for a visit by Prince Charles. Following a change of cleaning contract in early 2007, users of the station began to complain about an alleged deterioration in cleanliness at the station, particularly in the waiting rooms.

The station is used for the overnight servicing of trains. On 9 August 2003, an Arriva Trains Northern employee was seriously assaulted by a group of vandals after challenging two males daubing graffiti on a stabled train.

Skipton railway station is currently served by Stagecoach 280 cross-Pennine bus route to Preston via Clitheroe. It has been proposed as the focus of a park-and-ride scheme serving commuters to Lancaster and Leeds.

Station masters

John Dexter ca. 1851 ca. 1853
William Wilton Barker ca. 1860 - 1864
Thomas Needham Barlow 1864 - 1868 (convicted of embezzlement of company funds)
Anderson Wilcock 1868 – 1877 (formerly station master at Newark Castle)
Alfred Norman 1877 – 1908
William Coles 1908 – 1921 
J. Alderson 1921 – 1933 (formerly station master at Millers Dale)
Richard Southworth 1933 – 1945
Richard H. Lamb 1945 – 1949 
Maurice M.C. Hughes 1949 – 1953
Robert Henry Ruddock 1953 – ????

Services 

During Monday to Saturday daytime, there is a half-hourly service to both Leeds and Bradford Forster Square. There are additional trains to Leeds during the morning peak and in the opposite direction in the evening rush hour.  In the evenings there is a half-hourly service to Leeds, and an hourly service to Bradford Forster Square. From May 2022, the weekday daytime service to Bradford has been temporarily reduced to hourly for operational/staffing reasons.

On Sundays there is an hourly service to Leeds and Bradford (the latter upgraded from two-hourly at the December 2017 timetable change).

There are also a number of trains each day from Leeds to Carlisle (eight on weekdays and six on Sundays) and to Lancaster or Morecambe (eight on weekdays, five on Sundays; both routes operated by Northern). These usually serve the principal stations only between Leeds & Skipton. On Sundays, one Carlisle service runs to and from  – this has operated since the December 2012 timetable change (though previously southbound only until May 2018, with the morning equivalent starting in Sheffield) and is the first through Nottingham service from Skipton since the Nottingham –  via Leeds trains were withdrawn in May 1982. The timetable was modified from 27 June 2016 to permit through running as far as Armathwaite. Repair work on the damaged section was completed in the spring of 2017, with through services to Carlisle resuming on 31 March.

There is also a single daily through service from Skipton to London King's Cross (via Leeds), which is operated by London North Eastern Railway. A balancing return service also operates from King's Cross to Skipton – the southbound train does not run on Sundays, but that from London runs seven days per week.

The station is the limit of the Leeds North West electrification which was electrified under British Rail, where the electric commuter services from Leeds terminate.  The actual wiring extends beyond the station for a few hundred metres along the main line and into the carriage sidings, before it finally ends at the site of the former Skipton North Junction, where the Colne line diverged before its closure in 1970.

Future

As with much of the UK rail network, Skipton is likely to see changes over coming years in order to cope with expected growth. London North Eastern Railway (formerly Virgin Trains East Coast) has expressed a desire to introduce more direct services to London King's Cross in the future, although no specific commitments have been made as yet. Network Rail is also currently investigating means of increasing capacity on the Airedale Line to Leeds as part of the Yorkshire and Humber RUS. Options could include longer trains (up to six carriages in place of the current four) or more frequent services. Plans for the route north of Skipton have already been outlined in the Lancashire and Cumbria RUS: these will see an increase in trains to Carlisle, with services running to a basic one train every two hours pattern, with extra services to 'fill the gaps' at peak times. Leeds to Morecambe/Lancaster services would also be made more frequent – however, these more frequent services would only run as far as Skipton.  Opposition from stakeholders during the consultation phase of the RUS with regard to the loss of through trains to/from Leeds has meant that this option will likely not be pursued.

Further major alterations came about when the 2011 "Eureka" EC clock-face timetable came into effect, including a northbound Sundays only service from the capital. (now implemented – see above).

In the long term, SELRAP may achieve their aims of reopening the line to Colne, and it is possible that the Embsay and Bolton Abbey Steam Railway would be able to extend their services to Skipton in future. Both of these plans would likely result in many changes to the station.

Embsay and Bolton Abbey Steam Railway
Since preservation, it has always been a long-term plan for the preserved Embsay and Bolton Abbey Steam Railway to extend into Skipton.

The platforms (5 & 6) that went to Ilkley, were made redundant in 1965. However, in the February 2009 edition of railway Today's Railways UK, it was stated that Network Rail had carried out a survey for the reinstatement of the connecting points between the Embsay line and the freight line to Grassington, and the reinstatement of the platform 5 at Skipton. If funding is made available, then the line could be extended.

Platform 6 may also be reinstated as a run-round loop as part of the project.

Notes

References 
 Awdry, C. (1990), Encyclopaedia of British Railway Companies, Patrick Stephens Ltd., Wellingborough, 
 Bairstow, M. (2000), The "Little" North Western Railway, Martin Bairstow, Leeds, 
 Binns, D. (1984), Steam in Airedale, Wyvern Publications, Skipton, 
 Smith, F.W. and Bairstow, M. (1992), The Otley and Ilkley Joint Railway, Martin Bairstow, Halifax, 
 Smith, F.W. and Binns, D. (1986), The Skipton & Ilkley Line, Wyvern Publications, Skipton, 
 Suggitt, G. (2004 reprint), Lost Railways of Lancashire, Countryside Books, Newbury,

External links 

Photograph of Skipton railway station platforms
Embsay & Bolton Abbey Steam Railway – Photos of Skipton Station past & present

Railway stations in North Yorkshire
DfT Category D stations
Craven District
Former Midland Railway stations
Railway stations in Great Britain opened in 1847
Northern franchise railway stations
Railway stations served by London North Eastern Railway
Skipton
1847 establishments in England
Charles Trubshaw railway stations
Grade II listed buildings in North Yorkshire